Noramut is a village in the Lori Province of Armenia. The village was populated by Azerbaijanis before 1990.

References

External links 

Populated places in Lori Province